Luxembourg has a rich history of narrow-gauge railways. A few industrial and mining railways survive.

Metre-gauge railways, the Jhangeli
The name Jhangeli was commonly used for the metre-gauge network in Luxembourg. The lines were operated by different companies. Some lines were financed by the state of Luxembourg by means of granting exploration rights of iron ore to the railway companies. In the case of the Luxembourg–Remich line, for example, 3.3 ha of iron ore fields was granted per km built.

Luxemburger Sekundärbahnen (LSB) / Chemins de fer Secondaires Luxembourgeois (CSL), 1880–1934
 Luxembourg (city)–Remich S 27,15 km, 1882–1955
 Cruchten–Larochette (Fels) S 12,12 km, 1882–1948
 Larochette–Carrières Ernzen S 4,12 km, 1930–1948
Kantonalbahngesellschaft / Chemins de Fer Cantonaux (CC), 1880–1923
 Diekirch–Vianden C 14,11 km, 1889–1948
 Noerdange–Martelange C 29,54 km, 1890-1953
Vizinalbahnen / Chemins de Fer Vicinaux (CV), 1899–1934
 Bettembourg–Aspelt V 10,19 km, 1899–1952 
 Luxembourg–Echternach V 45,85 km, 1904–1954
Prinz Heinrich Eisenbahn / Chemins de fer Prince Henri (PH) 1868–1877 – 1940–1948
 Grundhof–Beaufort PH 7,4 km  1904–1948

Industrial railways
Numerous industrial railways were constructed at Differdange, Dudelange, Esch-sur-Alzette, Petange, Rumelange, Wasserbillig and others.

Mining railways

Decauville railways
Several dozens of Decauville railways served local communities, forests and, for example, the Saint-Maurice and Saint Maur Abbey near Clervaux.

References